Sadiya Siddiqui is an Indian film and television actress who rose to fame playing the role of Priya on the Zee Tv show Banegi Apni Baat. She is also known for playing Nanda in Star Plus's Tu Sooraj Main Saanjh, Piyaji. She won an ITA Award when she played the role of Sandhya in the famous tv series Balika Vadhu from 2008 to 2013.

Filmography

Films
1993 Little Buddha
1994 Kabhi Haan Kabhi Naa as Nikki
1994 (Movie Drohkaal as Sadiya Siddiqui)
1997 Uff! Yeh Mohabbat as Chicklet
1998 Hitler as Priya
2002 Kali Salwaar as Sultana
2003 Raghu Romeo as Sweety
2004 Bombay Summer as Suneeta
2005 Shabd as Rajni
2007 Just Married as Anaiya
2009 Unn Hazaaron Ke Naam as Hina
2011 Jo Dooba So Paar: It's Love in Bihar! as Gulabo
2013 Baga Beach as Maggie
2014 Kill the Rapist?
2014 CityLights as Sudha
2017 ajji  as leela
2021 Ramprasad ki Tehrvi as Pankaj's wife
2022 Holy Cow

Television
1993 Humrahi as child bride
1993 Byomkesh Bakshi as Rajni in the episode "Tasvir Chor" (credited as Sadia Siddiqui)
1994–98 Banegi Apni Baat as Priyanka
1999-2000 Star Bestsellers
2001-02 Maan as Ginni
2002 Sanjivani as Richa Asthana
2005 Guns & Roses  as Angie
2007-10 Sapna Babul Ka...Bidaai as Parul's dance teacher
2007 Saathi Re as Shalaka
2007 Saat Phere: Saloni Ka Safar as Gayatri 
2008-13 Balika Vadhu as Sandhya
2010-12 Sasural Genda Phool as Radha
2011 Hum as Phulwa
2012 Na Bole Tum Na Maine Kuch Kaha as Prerana Prateek Agarwal
2013-14 Rangrasiya as Mala 
2014 Yeh Hai Aashiqui as Tulsi (episodic role in episode 38)
2014-16 Satrangi Sasural as Priyanka
2014 Chashme Baddoor
2017-18 Tu Sooraj, Main Saanjh Piyaji as Nanda Devi Modani / Maasi Saa
2017-19 Yeh Un Dinon Ki Baat Hai as Adult Naina's voice
2020 PariWar- pyaar ke aagey war as Anju
2021 Barrister Babu as Thaku Maa

Theater
 2015 – produced Song of the Swan, a play in English/Hindi
 2018 – produced and acted in the play The Unexpected Man

Accolades
 2008 – Indian Television Academy Awards for Best Actress in a Supporting Role for Balika Vadhu

References

External links
 
 

Year of birth missing (living people)
Living people
Indian film actresses
Actresses in Hindi cinema
Indian television actresses
People from Aligarh